Robert Sinnerbrink is an Australian philosopher and Associate Professor of Philosophy at Macquarie University.
He is an ARC Future Fellowship recipient and a former Chair of the Australasian Society for Continental Philosophy (2007-2010).
Sinnerbrink is known for his research on aesthetics and philosophy of film.

Books
 Cinematic Ethics: Exploring Ethical Experience through Film, Abingdon and New York: Routledge, 2016
 New Philosophies of Film: Thinking Images, New York/London: Continuum, 2011
 Understanding Hegelianism, Chesham: Acumen Press, 2007
 Critique Today, edited with Jean-Philippe Deranty, Nicholas H. Smith, and Peter Schmiedgen, Leiden: Brill, 2006
 Recognition, Work, Politics: New Directions in French Critical Theory, edited with Jean-Philippe Deranty, Danielle Petherbridge, and John Rundell, Leiden: Brill, 2007

References

External links
 Robert Sinnerbrink at Macquarie University
 Robert Sinnerbrink, Google Scholar

Australian philosophers
Phenomenologists
Continental philosophers
Philosophy academics
Heidegger scholars
Hegel scholars
Living people
Academic staff of Macquarie University
University of Sydney alumni
Year of birth missing (living people)
Presidents of the Australasian Society for Continental Philosophy
Philosophers of art